Clarence William Allgood (September 12, 1902 – November 30, 1991) was a United States district judge of the United States District Court for the Northern District of Alabama.

Education and career

Born in Birmingham, Alabama, Allgood received a Bachelor of Science degree from Alabama Polytechnic Institute (now Auburn University) in 1926 and a Bachelor of Laws from Birmingham School of Law in 1941. He was a Referee in Bankruptcy for the United States District Court for the Northern District of Alabama from 1937 to 1961.

Federal judicial service

On October 5, 1961, Allgood received a recess appointment from President John F. Kennedy to a new seat on the United States District Court for the Northern District of Alabama created by 75 Stat. 80. Formally nominated to the same seat by President Kennedy on January 15, 1962, he was confirmed by the United States Senate on February 5, 1962, and received his commission on February 9, 1962. He assumed senior status on January 9, 1973, serving in that capacity until his death on November 30, 1991, in Birmingham.

See also
List of Auburn University people

References

Sources
 

1902 births
1991 deaths
Judges of the United States District Court for the Northern District of Alabama
United States district court judges appointed by John F. Kennedy
20th-century American judges
Auburn University alumni
Birmingham School of Law alumni
20th-century American lawyers